Good Old Boys is an album by American musician John Hartford, released in 1999.

Reception

Writing for Allmusic, critic Ronnie D. Lankford, Jr. wrote "Good Old Boys is something of a return to form for John Hartford... [it] doesn't stack up to Hartford's classic '70s albums, but it's a fun album that will please longtime fans." Kevin Oliver of Country Standard Time wrote "Hartford and his band make these new tunes sound old and lived - in, a comfortable fit for any ears."

Track listing
All songs written by John Hartford
"Good Old Boys" – 6:35
"On the Radio" – 5:31
"The Cross-Eyed Child" – 10:28
"Watching the River Go By" – 5:21
"The Waltz of the Mississippi" – 5:23
"Mike & John in the Wilderness" – 3:11
"Owl Feather" – 3:19
"Billy the Kid" – 4:32
"Dixie Trucker's Home" – 2:05
"The Waltz of the Golden Rule" – 2:57
"Keep on Truckin'" – 3:44

Personnel
John Hartford – banjo, fiddle, vocals, liner notes, photography
Bob Carlin – banjo
Mike Compton – mandolin, vocals
Larry Perkins – banjo
Mark Schatz – bass
Chris Sharp – guitar, vocals

Production
Produced by Bob Carlin
Wes Lachot – engineer
David Glasser – mastering
Tom Piazza – liner notes
David Lynch – design
Brandon Kirk - interior photographs

References

John Hartford albums
1999 albums